"For a Change" is a song written by John Scott Sherrill and Steve Seskin, and recorded by American country music artist Neal McCoy. It was released in December 1994 as the first single from his album You Gotta Love That. The song reached number 3 on the U.S. Billboard Hot Country Singles & Tracks chart and peaked at number 8 on the RPM Country Tracks in Canada.

Music video
The music video was directed by Marc Ball and premiered in December 1994.

Chart performance
"For a Change" debuted at number 73 on the U.S. Billboard Hot Country Singles & Tracks for the week of December 17, 1994.

Year-end charts

Parodies
American country music parody artist Cledus T. Judd released a parody of "For a Change" titled "The Change" on his 1996 album I Stoled This Record.

References

1994 singles
1994 songs
Neal McCoy songs
Songs written by John Scott Sherrill
Songs written by Steve Seskin
Song recordings produced by Barry Beckett
Atlantic Records singles